Albius Tibullus ( BC19 BC) was a Latin poet and writer of elegies. His first and second books of poetry are extant; many other texts attributed to him are of questionable origins.

Little is known about the life of Tibullus. There are only a few references to him by later writers and a short Life of doubtful authority. Neither his praenomen nor his birthplace is known, and his gentile name has been questioned. His status was probably that of a Roman eques (so the Life affirms), and he had inherited a considerable estate. Like Virgil, Horace and Propertius, he seems to have lost most of it in 41 BC in the confiscations of Mark Antony and Octavian.

Life 
Tibullus's chief friend and patron was Marcus Valerius Messalla Corvinus, himself an orator and poet as well as a statesman and a commander. Messalla, like Gaius Maecenas, was at the centre of a literary circle in Rome. This circle had no relationship with the court, and the name of Augustus is found nowhere in the writings of Tibullus. About 30 BC Messalla was dispatched by Augustus to Gaul to quell a rising in Aquitania and restore order in the country, and Tibullus may have been in his retinue. On a later occasion, probably in 28, he would have accompanied his friend who had been sent on a mission to the East, but he fell sick and had to stay behind in Corcyra. Tibullus had no liking for war, and though his life seems to have been divided between Rome and his country estate, his own preferences were wholly for the country life.

The loss of Tibullus's landed property is attested by himself (i.1, 19), as a farmer "felicis quondam, nunc pauperis agri" ("of a once fruitful, now impoverished field"; cf. 41, 42). Its cause is only an inference, though a very probable one. That he was allowed to retain a portion of his estate with the family mansion is clear from ii.4, 53. Tibullus may have been Messalla's contubernalis in the Aquitanian War (Vita Tib. and Tib. i.7, 9 seq., a poem composed for Messalla's triumph), and may have received dona militaria (Vita Tib.).

Tibullus died prematurely, probably in 19, and almost immediately after Virgil. His death made a deep impression in Rome, as is clear from his contemporary, Domitius Marsus, and from the elegy in which Ovid enshrined the memory of his predecessor.

Extant works

First book of poetry 
Tibullus's first book consists of poems written at various times between 30 and 26. His first love, the subject of book i., is called Delia in the poems, but Apuleius reveals that her real name was Plania. As regards her station, it should be noticed that she was not entitled to wear the stola, the dress of Roman matrons (i. 6, 68). Her husband is mentioned as absent (i. 2, 67 seq.). She eludes the custodes placed over her (i. 2, 15 and 6, 7). Tibullus's suit was favoured by Delia's mother, of whom he speaks in very affectionate terms (i. 6, 57 seq.). For Tibullus's illness at Corcyra, see i. 3, I seq., 55 seq. The fifth elegy was written during estrangement (discidium), and the sixth after the return of the husband and during Delia's double infidelity. It is impossible to give an exact account of the intimacy. The poems which refer to her are arranged in no chronological order. Sometimes she appears as single, sometimes as married; but we hear nothing either of her marriage or of her husband's death. Yet it is clear that it was the absence of her husband on military service in Cilicia which gave Tibullus the opportunity to see her, and he continued to do so when the husband returned. Delia was clever in deception—too clever, as Tibullus saw when he found that he was not the only lover. His entreaties and appeals were of no avail; and after the first book no more is heard of Delia. In addition, several elegies in Book I concern themselves with Tibullus's love for a boy, who is named Marathus.

The Marathus cycle 
The three poems centered on Marathus constitute the longest poetic project in Roman literature having homosexual love as theme. The first of these poems, 1.4, begins with an imprecation of the poet to the god Priapus, asking for advice on how to win over beautiful boys. The god advises patience and that the man in love yield to the beloved boy's every whim and perform a series of services if the boy demands it (1.4.15–53). At first the narrator of the poem presents himself as someone who is simply asking for advice from the god on behalf of a friend who fell in love with a boy but whose wife forbids such affairs (1.4.73). He later portrays himself as a teacher in the affairs of love, declaring that the doors of his house are open for other men in love with boys to ask his advice (1.4.78). In the end lines, however, he confesses to loving a boy named Marathus, who tortures him with "love's delay" (1.4.81) and whom the narrator can not conquer with his arts, causing other men to laugh at his lessons (1.4.83).

The cycle is resumed in poem 1.8, in which the narrator learns that Marathus is in love with a girl. The narrator advises the girl to treat Marathus with more leniency than Marathus treated the narrator himself (1.8.49). The narrator accompanies Marathus to the girl's house, carrying a torch to light the path at night, bribes her so that she meets Marathus, and talks the boy up to the girl (this is described in more detail the next poem, 1.9, lines 41–44). This poem can be seen as part of the narrator's efforts to win Marathus' goodwill by performing a series of humiliating tasks for him, exceeding the god's counsel to perform hard physical labors for the lad, by also helping him carry on an affairs with someone else.

In the poem that ends the cycle, 1.9, the narrator discovers that Marathus is in a relationship with a much older married man who buys the young man's affections through expensive gifts. Initially, the narrator asks the gods for compassion towards Marathus (1.9.5–6), who betrayed a promise he had made to the narrator, but soon love yields to bitterness, and he begins to express the desire that the gifts of the rival lover turn to ashes (1.9.11–12) and that the same happen to the poems that the narrator wrote to Marathus to win him over (1.9.48–49), of which he is now ashamed. He turns to the rival, taking revenge on him for having stolen her boyfriend by describing in detail the affair that the rival's wife is herself having with another boy (1.9.54–58 and 65–74). Finally, the poet addresses Marathus, telling him that he will cry when he sees the poet fall in love with another capricious lad (1.9.79–80), but declaring himself, for the moment being, finally released from unfaithful love.

Second book of poetry 
About the second book, scholars can only say that in all likelihood it was published before the poet's death in 19 BC. It is very short, containing only 428 verses, and apparently incomplete. In the second book the place of Delia is taken by "Nemesis", which is also a fictitious name. Nemesis (like the Cynthia of Propertius) was probably a courtesan of the higher class; and she had other admirers besides Tibullus. He complains bitterly of his bondage, and of her rapacity and hard-heartedness. In spite of all, however, she seems to have retained her hold on him until his death.

Ovid, writing at the time of Tibullus's death, says: "Sic Nemesis longum, sic Delia nomen habebunt, / altera cura recens, altera primus amor." ("Thus Nemesis and Delia will be long remembered: one Tibullus' recent love, the other his first."). Nemesis is the subject of book ii.3, 4, 6. The mention of an Una (ii.6) settles her position. The connection had lasted a year when ii.5 was written (see ver. 109). It is worth noticing that Martial selects Nemesis as the source of Tibullus's reputation.

Style of writing 
Though the character of Tibullus the historical man is unclear, the character of his poetic persona is reflected in his works. He was an amiable man of generous impulses and unselfish disposition, loyal to his friends to the verge of self-sacrifice (as is shown by his leaving Delia to accompany Messalla to Asia), and apparently constant to his mistresses. His tenderness towards them is enhanced by a refinement and delicacy which are rare among the ancients. When treated cruelly by his love, he does not invoke curses upon her head. Instead he goes to her little sister's grave, hung so often with his garlands and wet with his tears, to bemoan his fate. His ideal is a quiet retirement in the country with the loved one at his side. He has no ambition and not even a poet's yearning for immortality. In an age of crude materialism and gross superstition, he was religious in the old Roman way. His clear, finished and yet unaffected style made him a great favourite and placed him, in the judgment of Quintilian, ahead of other elegiac writers. For natural grace and tenderness, for exquisiteness of feeling and expression, he stands alone. He rarely overloads his lines with Alexandrian learning. However, his range is limited. Tibullus is smoother and more musical, but liable to become monotonous; Propertius, with occasional harshnesses, is more vigorous and varied. In many of Tibullus's poems a symmetrical composition can be traced.

Specimens of Tibullus at his best may be found in i. I, 3, 89–94; 5, 19–36; 9, 45–68; ii. 6. Quintilian says, "Elegia quoque Graecos provocamus, cuius mihi tersus atque elegans maxime videtur auctor Tibullus; sunt qui Propertium malint; Ovidius utroque lascivior, sicut durior Gallus." ("In Elegy as well we rival the Greeks; of whom for me the author Tibullus seems the most polished and elegant; there are those who prefer Propertius; Ovid is more wanton than either, just as Gallus is more stern.")

Questionable attributions 
Some of the genuine poems of Tibullus have been lost. On the other hand, much of the work attributed to him is that of others. Only the first and second books can uncontroversially claim his authorship. In both books occur poems which give evidence of internal disorder; but scholars cannot agree upon the remedies to be applied.

Third book of poetry 
The third book contains 290 verses. The writer calls himself Lygdamus, and it is unknown when his poems were added to the genuine poems of Tibullus.

Fourth book of poetry 
The separation of the fourth book from the third has no ancient authority. It dates from the revival of letters, and is due to the Italian scholars of the 15th century. The fourth book consists of poems of very different quality. The first is a composition in 211 hexameters on the achievements of Messalla, and is very poor. The author is unknown; but he was certainly not Tibullus. The poem itself was written in 31, the year of Messalla's consulship.

The next eleven poems relate to the loves of Sulpicia and Cerinthus. Sulpicia was a Roman lady of high station and, according to Moritz Haupt's conjecture, the daughter of Valeria, Messalla's sister. The Sulpicia elegies divide into two groups. The first comprises iv. 2–6, containing ninety-four lines, in which the theme of the attachment is worked up into five graceful poems. The second, iv. 7–12, consists of Sulpicia's own letters. They are very short, only forty lines in all; but they have a unique interest as being the only love poems by a Roman woman that have survived. Their frank and passionate outpourings are reminiscent of Catullus. The style and metrical handling was originally understood to be that of a novice, or a male poet appropriating female form. Later analysis has concluded that Sulpicia is an adept poet with a very high level of skill, playing upon gender norms in the celebration of her erotic relationship and play upon her "fama" as a poet and a woman of high status. The thirteenth poem (twenty-four lines) claims to be by Tibullus; but it is hardly more than a cento from Tibullus and Propertius. The fourteenth is a four-line epigram with nothing to determine its authorship. Last of all comes the epigram or fragment of Domitius Marsus already referred to.

Some scholars attribute iii. 8-12 - iv. 2–6 to Tibullus himself; but the style is different, and the validity of this attribution is uncertain. The direct ascription of iii. 19 – iv. 13 (verse 13, "nunc licet e caelo mittatur amica Tibullo" – "Now grant that a lover be sent from heaven to Tibullus") to Tibullus probably led to its inclusion in the collection and later on to the addition of the third book to the two genuine ones. For the evidence against the ascription, see Postgate.

To sum up: the third and fourth books appear in the oldest tradition as a single book, and they comprise pieces by different authors in different styles, none of which can be assigned to Tibullus with any certainty. The natural conclusion is that a collection of scattered compositions, relating to Messalla and the members of his circle, was added as an appendix to the genuine relics of Tibullus. When this "Messalla collection" was made cannot be exactly determined; but it was definitely not till after the death of Tibullus, 19 BC, and perhaps as late as the late 1st century AD. Besides the foregoing, two pieces in the collection called Priapea (one an epigram and the other a longer piece in iambics) have been attributed to Tibullus; but there is little external and no internal evidence of his authorship.

Charisius quotes part of a hexameter which is not found in the extant poems of Tibullus.

The Vita Tibulli 
The value of the short Vita Tibulli, found at the end of the Ambrosian, Vatican and inferior manuscripts, has been much discussed. There is little in it that we could not infer from Tibullus himself and from what Horace says about Albius, though it is possible that its compiler may have taken some of his statements from Suetonius's book De Poetis. It is another moot question of some importance whether our poet should be identified with the Albius of Horace, as is done by the Horatian commentator Pomponius Porphyrion (AD 200–250) in his Scholia. Porphyrio's view was examined by Postgate.

Manuscripts 
The best manuscript of Tibullus is the Ambrosianus (A), which has been dated , whose earliest known owner was the humanist Coluccio Salutati. Two early 15th-century manuscripts are Paris lat. 7989 (written in Florence in 1423) and the Vatican MS. Ottob. lat. 1202 (also written in Florence, 1426). These form only a small share of the over 100 Renaissance manuscripts. There are also a number of extracts from Tibullus in Florilegium Gallicum, an anthology from various Latin writers collected in the mid-twelfth century, and a few extracts in the Excerpta frisingensia, preserved in a manuscript now at Munich. Also excerpts from the lost Fragmentum cuiacianum, made by Scaliger, and now in the library at Leiden are of importance for their independence of A. It contained the part from 3.4.65 to the end, useful as fragments go as the other manuscripts lack 3.4.65. The Codex cuiacianus, a late manuscript containing Catullus, Tibullus and Propertius, is still extant.

Editions 
Tibullus was first printed with Catullus, Propertius, and the Silvae of Statius by Vindelinus de Spira (Venice, 1472), and separately by Florentius de Argentina, probably in the same year. Amongst other editions are those by Scaliger (with Catullus and Propertius, 1577, etc.), Broukhusius (1708), Vulpius (1749), Heyne (1817, 4th ed. by Wunderlich, with supplement by Dissen, 1819), Huschke (1819), Lachmann (1829), Dissen (1835). Among more modern editions Emil Baehrens (1878, the first of the modern critical editions) has outlived his contemporaries Lucian Müller (1870), Heinrich Dittrich (1881), Edward Hiller (1885) and John Percival Postgate (1905). Guy Lee's edition and translation of books 1-2 (Cambridge, 1975) is based on a fresh collation of A. Of the commentaries Heyne's and Huschke's are still of value. The greater part of the poems are included in Postgate's Selections (with English notes, 1903). A history of later contributions is given in Augustin Cartault's A propos du corpus Tibullianum (1906; not quite complete); see also his Tibulle et les auteurs du Corpus Tibullianum (Paris, 1909).

For further information see the accounts in Teuffel's History of Roman Literature (translated by Warr), Martin Schanz's Geschichte der romischen Litteratur, and F. Marx's article s.v. "Albius", in Pauly-Wissowa's Realencyclopädie.

Critiques
Scholar Francis Cairns regards Tibullus as "a good poet but not a great one"; Dorothea Wender similarly calls him a minor poet but argues there is "grace and polish and symmetry" to his work.

References

Citations

Bibliography
 
 . &

Further reading 
 Bowditch, P. L. "Tibullus and Egypt: A Postcolonial Reading of Elegy 1.7." Arethusa, 44 (2011), pp. 89–122.
 Bright, D. F. Haec mihi Fingebam: Tibullus and his World. Leiden: Brill, 1978.
 Cairns, Francis. Tibullus: A Hellenistic Poet at Rome. Cambridge: Cambridge University Press, 1979.
 Damer, E. Z. "Gender Reversals and Intertextuality in Tibullus", Classical World 107 (2014), pp. 493–514.
 Gaisser, J. H. 'Amor, rura and militia in Three Elegies of Tibullus: 1.1, 1.5, 1.10", Latomus 42 (1983), pp. 58–72.
 Houghton, L. B. T. "Tibullus' Elegiac Underworld", Classical Quarterly, 57 (2007), pp. 153–165.
 James, S. Learned Girls and Male Persuasion: Gender and Reading in Roman Love Elegy. Berkeley: University of California Press, 2003.
 Miller, P. A. Subjecting Verses: Latin Love Elegy and the Emergence of the Real. Princeton: Princeton University Press, 2004.
 Nikoloutsos, K. "From Tomb to Womb: Tibullus 1.1 and the Discourse of Masculinity in Post-Civil war Rome", Scholia: Natal Studies in Classical Antiquity, 20 (2011), pp. 52–71.
 Wray, David. "What Poets Do: Tibullus on 'Easy' Hands", Classical Philology, 98 (2003), pp. 217–250.

External links 

 Works by Tibullus at Perseus Digital Library
 The Elegies of Tibullus at The Latin Library
 
 
 
 Selections from Tibullus – translated, with an Introduction, Notes, and Glossary by Jon Corelis

55 BC births
19 BC deaths
Golden Age Latin writers
1st-century BC Roman poets
Elegiac poets
Albii
Bisexual poets
Italian LGBT poets
LGBT history in Italy
Ancient LGBT people